Angel Rodriguez is a 2005 American television film, that showed at the Toronto International Film Festival under the title Angel. HBO picked up the film and released it under the longer name both on their movie channel and on DVD.

Premise
Angel (Jonan Everett) is a troubled teen in Brooklyn, New York, who is homeless after being kicked out by his father. He is—for a while—taken in by a kind-hearted social worker (Rachel Griffiths) who has her own problems.

He later tries to find support and shelter with friends from his school, and eventually attempting to find a way to get by on his own.

References

External links
 
 

2005 films
HBO Films films
American drama television films
2005 drama films
2000s English-language films
2000s American films